Garakan (also Romanized as Garakān and Gerakān ) is a village in Garakan Rural District, in the Central District of Ashtian County, Markazi Province, Iran. At the 2006 census, its population was 799, in 245 families.

References 

It is said that the village took its name after its Zoroastrian inhabitants as ‘Gebr-Makan’ which means the place of Zoroastrians, Gebr = Zoroastrian & ‘Makan’= place in Persian. It is also said that the village's name was changed after a certain period of time by its inhabitants through different pronunciation to Garakan.

.گرکان نام روستایی از توابع آشتیان در استان مرکزی است که محل تولد بزرگانی همچون دکتر عبدالعظیم قریب و دکتر عبدالکریم قریب و دکتر محمد قریب  می باشد

One of the famous Iranians , Doctor Mohammad Gharib was one of the most famous Iranian physician, distinguished university professor and a pioneer of pediatrics who was originally from Garakan.
Doctor Mohammad Gharib is known as Father of Iranian Pediatrics. He was a graduate of Paris University Medical School .
Garakan has been shown in the TV serie Roozegar-e Gharib as a village where has been annually visited by doctor Mohammad Gharib. Doctor visited Garakan once a year with luggage full of medicines to help and cure his people. 

Populated places in Ashtian County